Gorgon Pool is a lake, or perhaps lagoon, between the Chimaera Flats and Kraken Cove in Candlemas Island, South Sandwich Islands. It was named by the UK Antarctic Place-Names Committee in association with nearby Medusa Pool. The Gorgon is a mythical creature of Homer's Iliad, linked in other mythology with Medusa.

References

Lakes of South Georgia and the South Sandwich Islands